Alatsinainy Bakaro is a town in Analamanga Region, in the  Central Highlands of Madagascar, located at 68 km from the capital of Antananarivo. It belongs to the district of Andramasina and its populations numbers to 20,370 in 2018.

References

External links

Populated places in Analamanga